Louis Gabriel Montigny (3 December 1784 – 10 January 1846 ) was a 19th-century French playwright and writer.

Short biography 
Louis Gabriel was the son of Rémy Montigny, master perfumer and of Marie-Madeleine-Gabrielle Mignot, domiciled rue Saint-Honoré. He married Julie-Celestine Massiet 18 July 1825 in Montron, (Aisne).

An officer in the military, director of the Moniteur de l'armée, he became a journalist and a dramatist. His plays were presented on the most important parisians stages of the 19th century, including the Théâtre de la Porte-Saint-Martin, the Théâtre de l'Ambigu-Comique, and the Théâtre de la Gaîté.

He is buried at Montmartre Cemetery, 22nd division, with his wife who died 15 January 1879 in the 16th arrondissement of Paris, his daughter Marie-Louise-Delphine de Montigny (1826-1897), and his son in law, general Joseph-Augustin-Eugène Daguerre (1814-1879). The grave is to the right of the tomb of the painter Gustave Moreau, facing l'avenue du Tunnel.

Works 
1821: Les Français en cantonnement, ou la Barbe postiche, vaudeville in 1 act
1822: Mon cousin Lalure, comedy in 1 act, en prose
1823: Fragments d'un miroir brisé, anecdotes contemporaines (françaises et anglaises), traits de morale et d'observation, esquisses de mœurs, revue des usages, aperçus philosophiques, réflexions, remarques, bons mots et réparties
1824: Dix aventures de garnison : le Chirurgien improvisé, le Moderne Joseph, Histoire d'une jolie comtesse, la Fille du pasteur de Neustadt, la Morale à la hussarde, Athénaïs, la Belle inconnue, la Soubrette, Une aventure tragique, les Trois duels
1824: Le Troubadour étique, romance
1825: Le Provincial à Paris, esquisses des mœurs parisiennes, 3 vols.
1825 Le Carnaval, ou les Figures de cire, folie-parade-vaudeville en 1 act
1825: La Chaise de poste, melodrama in 2 acts, with Saint-Amand
1825: Les Girouettes de village, comedy in 1 act, mingled with couplets, with Saint-Amand
1825: La Dot et la Fille, ou le Commis marchand, comedy in 1 act, mingled with couplets, with W. Lafontaine
1826: Le Commis-voyageur, ou le Bal et la Saisie, comédie-vaudeville en 1 act
1826: Mon ami de Paris, ou le Retour en province, comedy in 1 act, mingled with couplets
1827: Le Café de la garnison, vaudeville in 1 act, mingled with couplets
1827: Les Cavaliers et les Fantassins, tableau militaire in 1 act
1827: Le Colonel Duvar, fils naturel de Napoléon, publié d'après les Mémoires d'un contemporain
1827: Le Mari de toutes les femmes, comédie-vaudeville in 1 act
1828: La Nourrice sur lieu, scènes de famille, mingled with couplets, with Armand-François Jouslin de La Salle, Théodore Nézel and Jean-Gilbert Ymbert
1833: Souvenirs anecdotiques d'un officier de la Grande Armée
 Quinze jours à Prague

Bibliography 
 Ludovic Lalanne, Dictionnaire historique de la France, 1872, 
 Camille Dreyfus, André Berthelot, La Grande encyclopédie, 1886,

References

External links 
 Louis Gabriel Montigny on Data.bnf.fr

19th-century French dramatists and playwrights
Writers from Paris
1784 births
1846 deaths
Burials at Montmartre Cemetery